Salomão Abílio Mondlane (born 2 October 1995) is a Mozambican footballer who plays as a defender for Costa do Sol and the Mozambique national football team.

Career

International
Mondlane made his senior international debut on 29 March 2015, playing the entirety of a 2-1 friendly victory over Botswana. He scored his first international goal two years later, netting in the 5th minute of a 2–2 draw with Madagascar during African Nations Championship qualifying.

Career statistics

International

International Goals
Scores and results list Mozambique's goal tally first.

References

External links
Salomão Mondlane at EuroSport

1995 births
Living people
CD Costa do Sol players
Moçambola players
Mozambican footballers
Mozambique international footballers
Association football defenders

facebook